The national flag of Tajikistan was adopted in November 1992, replacing the flag of the Tajik Soviet Socialist Republic of 1953.  The flag is a horizontal tricolor of red, white (double width) and green, with a yellow crown surmounted by an arc of seven stars at the centre. It has a width ratio of 2:3:2. The tricolor preserves the choice of colors in the former Tajik Soviet flag, as well as the 1:2 proportions.

The flag day is celebrated on 24 November, which is the day it was officially adopted.

Design and symbolism
The flag of Tajikistan is a tricolour of red, white, and green. The red represents the unity of the nation as well as victory and sunrise. The red also serves as symbolism of the former Russian and Soviet eras, the workers, and the warriors who sacrificed their lives to protect the land. The white represents purity, morality, the snow and ice of the mountains, and cotton. The green represents the bountiful generosity of nature, fertile valleys, the religion of Islam, and the celebration of Novruz. Other interpretations of the colours state that the flag symbolically unifies the people of Tajik society, with the red stripe representing the manual labour class, the white stripe representing the intellectual worker class, and the green representing the agricultural class living in Tajikistan's rural or mountainous regions.

While the red and green stripes on the top and bottom are equal in size, the center stripe is one-and-a-half times that of the others.

The crown and stars are set in a rectangle taking up 80% of the white stripe's height.
The crown represents the Samanid dynasty and Tajik people, as the name Tajik is connected with Persian tâj "crown" in popular etymology. The flag of Tajikistan features seven stars due to the significance of the number seven in Persian mythology, representing perfection and happiness. According to traditional belief, the heavens feature seven mountains and seven orchard gardens with a star shining above each mountain.

Presidential standard

The Standard of the President of Tajikistan was introduced in 2006, on the occasion of the inauguration ceremony for the third term of Emomali Rahmon  as head of state. 
It uses the Tajik tricolour charged with a depiction of the Derafsh Kāviān, the Sassanid royal standard. Inside the Derafsh Kāviān is a depiction of a winged lion against a blue sky under a smaller representation of the crown and seven stars.

The center of the standard features elements formerly used as symbols of Tajikistan in the Emblem of Tajikistan. The presidential standard also includes a star in each of the four corners to represent the four regions of Tajikistan.

Historical flags

Under Soviet rule, the Union Republic used a flag derived from the flag of the Soviet Union and representing Communism, that was approved in 1953.  The flag is similar to the Soviet Union design but with the addition of a white and a green stripe. This flag also contains the red-white-green color order where the white stripe is larger than the green, which is currently used in the national flag.

As a Soviet republic, the red symbolized the workers' revolution, the white symbolized cotton, and the green symbolized agriculture.

The Soviet era flag was two-sided. Its backside was a mirror of the obverse face without the hammer, sickle, and star. Following independence on September 9, 1991, Tajikistan adopted its first post-independence flag by removing the Soviet symbolism from the canton, making the national flag identical to the backside of the Soviet era flag. This design remained in use until the new Tajik flag was adopted, making Tajikistan the last former Soviet country to receive a new flag.

Gallery

See also

Emblem of Tajikistan
National symbols of Tajikistan
History of Tajikistan
Flag of Iran
Flag of Hungary (similar tricolour)

References

External links

 
 VEXILLOGRAPHIA - Флаги Таджикистана

Tajikistan
Flag
Tajikistan
Tajikistan